Tobi 25 - Coptic Calendar - Tobi 27

The twenty-sixth day of the Coptic month of Tobi, the fifth month of the Coptic year. On a common year, this day corresponds to January 21, of the Julian Calendar, and February 3, of the Gregorian Calendar. This day falls in the Coptic Season of Shemu, the season of the Harvest.

Commemorations

Martyrs 

 The martyrdom of the Forty-Nine Saints, the Elders of Scetis
 The martyrdom of Saint Bagoush

Saints 
 The departure of Saint Ansatasia

References 

Days of the Coptic calendar